Sir Alexander Erskine (died 3 April 1756) was the 5th Earl of Kellie. He had a daughter, Janet, who married Sir Robert Anstruther, 3rd Baronet of Balcaskie.

References 

Alexander
5
1756 deaths
Year of birth unknown